The women's long jump event at the 2007 European Athletics U23 Championships was held in Debrecen, Hungary, at Gyulai István Atlétikai Stadion on 14 and 15 July.

Medalists

Results

Final
15 July

Qualifications
14 July
Qualifying 6.25 or 12 best to the Final

Group A

Group B

Participation
According to an unofficial count, 22 athletes from 17 countries participated in the event.

 (1)
 (2)
 (1)
 (1)
 (3)
 (1)
 (1)
 (1)
 (1)
 (1)
 (3)
 (1)
 (1)
 (1)
 (1)
 (1)
 (1)

References

Long jump
Long jump at the European Athletics U23 Championships